Carmelito Masagnay Reyes, better known as Shalala (January 20, 1960 – June 23, 2021), was a Filipino radio and TV personality and comedian.

Early life
Carmelito Reyes aka "Shalala" was born on January 20, 1960, in Manila, Philippines.

Early career
Shalala's 1st TV Show was "Walang Tulugan With The Master Showman" in 2001 on GMA-7 with the late Master Showman & fellow comedian German "Kuya Germs" Moreno until 2010, Shalala returned to the show around 2014, but he transferred to TV5 around 2010 for his new projects TV shows, and his other acting skills and hosting jobs on his former TV network.

Later career
Shalala returned to GMA Channel 7 in 2014 following his return to "Walang Tulugan With The Master Showman" with new host Nora Aunor replacing the late Kuya Germs who died in 2016, but the show ended also the same year last February 2016.

In 2017, Shalala returned to TV again for guesting in Sunday Pinasaya also on GMA 7, this was his 1st guesting TV appearance since following after Kuya Germs' death exactly 1 year in 2016.

He was a former supporting cast in ABS-CBN's defunct afternoon teleserye Pusong Ligaw with his co-star Bianca King, that also came from TV5. They were also joined by Beauty Gonzalez, but the drama series ended around January 2018.  This was Shalala's 1st ABS-CBN 2 Show since he left GMA 7.

Shalala returned to his original TV network GMA 7 via a weekend musical variety program, "Sunday PinaSaya", and a comedy anthology, "Dear Uge" in which he played a gay father around 2019, and he guested in a morning talk program, "Mars Pa More" and he played in a popular segment, "Bawal Judgmental!" on "Eat Bulaga" in 2020, and he also guested in Chika Beshalso in 2020 and was also his last TV appearance.

Personal life
Shalala's relative was Walter Mark "Nonong" Ballinan, a comedian and TV host of ABS-CBN.

Death
Shalala died of pulmonary tuberculosis on the morning of June 23, 2021, at the Fe Del Mundo Medical Center in Quezon City. He was 61.

Filmography

Radio
Shalala and Friends (DWBL (April–October 2015), DZRJ (October 2015 – 2017))
Master Showman: Walang Siyesta (Super Radyo DZBB 594) (2013–2014) 
Ladies' Room (Super Radyo DZBB 594) (2013–2014)
Showbiz Rampa! (103.5 Wow FM (2010–2013), 106.7 Energy FM (2013–2014))
Todo Bigay! (Radyo5 92.3 News FM) (2010–2014)

Television
Walang Tulugan with the Master Showman (GMA 7, 2001–2010, 2014–2016) co-host
StarTalk (GMA 7, 2005–2015) - guest co host
Daisy Siete Season 22: Kambalilong (GMA 7, 2009)
Tweetbiz (QTV, 2010) paparazzi
"Eat Bulaga!" (GMA 7, 2010 – 202?) guest
Juicy! (TV5, 2010–2012) host
Swerte Swerte Lang (TV5, 2011) host
Inday Wanda (TV5, 2011)
Hey it's Saberdey! (TV5, 2011–2012) host
Good Morning Club (TV5, 2012–2014) co-host
"Wasak!" (ONE PH, 2013) - guest
"Bubble Gang" (GMA 7, 2015 – 202?) - guest
"Sabado Badoo" (GMA 7, 2015) - cameo footage featured
CelebriTV (GMA 7, 2015) - co-host
"Ang Pinaka" (GMA News TV 27, 2015 – 202?) - guest 
"StarStruck Season 6" (GMA 7, 2015-2016) - guest talent manager
Dear Uge (GMA 7, 2016 – 202?) - various/guest
Sunday Pinasaya (GMA 7, 2017) - guest
Pusong Ligaw (ABS-CBN, 2017) - supporting cast
"Magandang Buhay" (ABS-CBN 2, 2017) - guest
Home Sweetie Home (ABS-CBN 2, 2017) - guest
Banana Sundae (ABS-CBN 2, 2017) - guest
"MMK: Ang Tahanan Mo" (ABS-CBN 2, 2018) - various/guest
"StarStruck Season 7" (GMA 7, 2018) - guest talent manager
"Mars Pa More" (GMA 7, 2019 – 202?) - guest
"Magpakailanman" (GMA 7, 2019) - various/guest
"Pepito Manaloto" (GMA 7, 2020) - guest funny gay character
"Wag Po!" (TV5, 2020) - guest
"Fill In The Banks" (TV5, 2020) - guest
"Chika Besh!" (TV5, 2020) - guest

Movies
Kalakal (2008) Mama Sads
Paupahan (2008) Isah
Booking (2009)
Ang Darling Kong Aswang (2009)
Si Agimat at si Enteng Kabisote (2010)
Petrang Kabayo (2010)
Ligo na Ü, Lapit na Me (2011)
Si Agimat, Si Enteng Kabisote, At Si Ako (2012)
Echoserang Frog (2014)

Miscellaneous crew
Ping Lacson: Super Cop (2000) adprom staff
Luv Text (2001) advertising and promotions staff
Batas ng Lansangan (2002) advertising and promotions staff: Maverick Films
You and Me Against the World (2003) staff: Fix Media Ventures
Utang ng Ama (2003) advertising and promotions staff
Pasukob (2007) overall promotions staff: TV and special events
Paupahan (2008) publicity and promotions
One Night Only (2008) television coordinator: publicity & promotions
Marino (2009) publicity and promotions

References

1960 births
2021 deaths
Filipino male comedians
Filipino radio personalities
Filipino television personalities
Filipino gay actors
Male actors from Manila
Tuberculosis deaths in the Philippines
21st-century deaths from tuberculosis
GMA Network personalities
TV5 (Philippine TV network) personalities
ABS-CBN personalities